Ammotrechella is a genus of ammotrechid camel spiders, first described by Carl Friedrich Roewer in 1934.

Species 
, the World Solifugae Catalog accepts the following fifteen species:

 Ammotrechella apejii Muma, 1971 — Jamaica
 Ammotrechella bahamica Muma, 1986 — Bahamas
 Ammotrechella bolivari Mello-Leitão, 1942 — Mexico
 Ammotrechella bonariensis (Werner, 1925) — Bonaire
 Ammotrechella cubae (Lucas, 1835) — Cuba
 Ammotrechella diaspora Roewer, 1934 — Cape Verde
 Ammotrechella geniculata (C.L. Koch, 1842) — Bahamas, Cape Verde, Colombia, Curaçao, Ecuador, Guadeloupe, St. Vincent and Grenadines, Venezuela
 Ammotrechella hispaniolana Armas & Alegre, 2001 — Dominican Republic
 Ammotrechella jutisi Armas & Teruel, 2005 — Cuba
 Ammotrechella maguirei Muma, 1986 — Turks and Caicos Islands
 Ammotrechella pallida Muma & Nezario, 1971 — Puerto Rico
 Ammotrechella pseustes (Chamberlin, 1925) — Panama, Puerto Rico, US (California)
 Ammotrechella setulosa Muma, 1951 — US (Texas)
 Ammotrechella stimpsoni (Putnam, 1883) — Mexico, US (Florida)
 Ammotrechella tabogana (Chamberlin, 1919) — Panama

References 

Arachnid genera
Solifugae